Achim is a male forename and a surname.

Origin and meaning
Achim is the German short name for Joachim or Jehoiakim (Hebrew meaning "he whom Jehovah has set up"). In the Bible, Achim is mentioned in Jesus' genealogy as the son of Zadok and father of Eliud (Mt 1:14). In this case, Achim means presumably "he will make" or "he will set up" in Hebrew (יקים).

Name days
A name day is the feast day of a saint after whom a person is named.
July 26
August 16

Persons with the given name
Achim Albrecht (born 1962), German bodybuilder and professional wrestler
Achim Benning (born 1935), German actor and director
Achim Fiedler (born 1965), German conductor
Achim Freyer (born 1934), German stage director, set designer and painter
Achim Gercke (1902–1997), German politician
Achim Glückler (born 1964), German former football player
Achim Grabowski, German ten-pin-bowler
Achim Hill (born 1935), German former rower
Achim Lippoth (born 1968), German photographer
Achim Moeller (born 1942), German-American art dealer, art historian, curator, agent, and appraiser
Achim Müller, German scientist
Achim Peters (born 1957), German obesity specialist
Achim Pfuderer (born 1975), German football player
Achim Reichel (born 1944), German musician, record producer and songwriter
Achim Richter (born 1940), German nuclear physicist
Achim Schwarze (born 1958), German author
Achim Sidorov (born 1936), Romanian former sprint canoer
Achim Steiner (born 1961), German expert in environmental politics
Achim Stößer (born 1963), German author and animal rights activist
Achim Stocker (1935–2009), German president of football club SC Freiburg
Achim Vogt (born 1970), Liechtenstein former alpine skier
Achim von Britzke (1920–1945), German soldier
Achim Warmbold (born 1941), German former rally driver
Achim Weber (born 1969), German football coach and former player
Achim (biblical figure) (born Unknown), Son of Zadok, father of Eliud, mentioned in the Gospel of Matthew

Persons with the surname
Cosmin Achim (born 1995), Romanian footballer
Florin Achim (born 1991), Romanian footballer
Honoré Achim (1881–1950), Canadian politician and lawyer
Sebastian Achim (born 1986), Romanian football player
Ștefan Achim (1930–2007), Romanian weightlifter and military officer
Vlad Achim (born 1989), Romanian football player

See also
Ludwig Achim von Arnim, German poet and novelist
Hans Achim Litten, German lawyer and Nazi-resistor

Masculine given names
German masculine given names